Prague 20, also known as Horní Počernice (German Ober Potschernitz), is a municipal district (městská část) in Prague. It is located in the eastern part of the city. It is formed by one cadastre Horní Počernice. , there were 15,404 inhabitants living in Prague 20.

The administrative district (správní obvod) of the same name is identical with the municipal district Prague 20.

Twin towns 
 Brunsbüttel, Germany (2004)

External links 
 Prague 20 - Horní Počernice - Official homepage

Districts of Prague